Arcade America is a 1996 platform game developed and published by 7th Level for Microsoft Windows and Macintosh.

Plot
Joey's band "Joey and the Monsters" is offered a deal to perform at Woodstock. The next day, the monsters try to wake Joey up, but he's a heavy sleeper. They decide to try blowing up his house in order to get him up in time, causing California to get destroyed and sending the monsters flying across America. Now Joey must travel across the US to save his friends and eventually make it to Woodstock in time.

Gameplay
The game stars Joey and his monsters. This is a side scrolling arcade platform game about traveling across America to find all of Joey's missing monsters.

Development
In the German version of Arcade America, German singer & songwriter Nina Hagen voices Joey's mother as well as three other characters; this was a selling point present in advertisements, and is featured on the front cover of the German version of the game.

Reception

Next Generation reviewed the Windows version of the game, rating it three stars out of five, and stated that "It's an interesting platform puzzler, and some of the challenges will surprise even the most adept gamer. Still, if you're looking for a good action title, there are better ones out there."

German gaming magazine PC Joker gave the Windows version of Arcade America an overall score of 56%, praising the game's "cute" graphics that are "animated with care", as well as the game's humor, but criticized the game's "limited" longevity and 'unoriginal' gameplay, summarizing the game as "getting the character from the bottom to the top of the screen without getting hurt". PC Joker praised Nina Hagen's "first-class" voiceover work and Arcade America's overall "witty" presentation, but expressed that while visually and aurally appealing, Arcade America is "boring".

German gaming magazine PC Player gave the Windows version of Arcade America an overall score of three stars out of five, and PC Games gave 82%.

References

External links

7th Level games
1996 video games
BMG Interactive games
Classic Mac OS games
Platform games
Video games developed in the United States
Windows games